Eremiascincus emigrans  is a species of skink found in Indonesia.

References

Eremiascincus
Reptiles described in 1895
Taxa named by Theodorus Willem van Lidth de Jeude